Group F of the women's football tournament at the 1996 Summer Olympics was played from 21 to 25 July 1996, and included Brazil, Germany, Japan and Norway. The top two teams advanced to the Semi-finals, while the bottom two placed teams were eliminated from the competition.

All times are EST (UTC−5).

Teams

Standings

Matches

Germany vs Japan

Norway vs Brazil

Brazil vs Japan

Norway vs Germany

Brazil vs Germany

Norway vs Japan

References

Women's football at the 1996 Summer Olympics